John Britton (April 21, 1919 – December 2, 1990) was an American baseball third baseman in the Negro leagues and in the Japanese Pacific League. He played professionally from 1940 to 1953, playing with the St. Louis–New Orleans Stars, Chicago American Giants, Cincinnati/Indianapolis Clowns, Birmingham Black Barons, and Hankyu Braves. During the 1944 Negro World Series, Britton was injured in a car accident, along with Tommy Sampson, Pepper Bassett, and Leandy Young. Britton suffered a dislocated left hand. Britton and Jimmy Newberry were the first African-Americans to play on a Japanese baseball team.

See also 
 American expatriate baseball players in Japan

References

External links
 and Baseball-Reference Black Baseball, Mexican League, and Minor League stats and Seamheads

1919 births
1990 deaths
American expatriate baseball players in Japan
Birmingham Black Barons players
Chicago American Giants players
Cincinnati Clowns players
Indianapolis Clowns players
Hankyu Braves players
St. Louis–New Orleans Stars players
Baseball players from Georgia (U.S. state)
People from Mount Vernon, Georgia
Azules de Veracruz players
American expatriate baseball players in Canada
American expatriate baseball players in Mexico
Winnipeg Buffaloes players
Elmwood Giants players
20th-century African-American sportspeople
Baseball infielders